Konstantin Vorobyov is the name of

 Konstantin Vorobyov (writer) (1919–1975), Russian-Soviet writer
 Konstantin Vorobyov (athlete) (born 1930), Soviet marathon runner
 Konstantin Vorobyov (actor) (born 1960), Russian actor in Treasure Island (1982 film)